The Town class consisted of 10 light cruisers built for the Royal Navy during the 1930s. The Towns were designed to the constraints imposed by the London Naval Treaty of 1930. The ships were built in three distinct sub-classes, the Southampton, Gloucester and Edinburgh classes respectively, each sub-class adding on further weaponry.

Armament

Like their US and Japanese counterparts of that era, the Town-class cruisers were "light cruisers" in the strict terms of the London Treaty, which defined a "light cruiser" as one having a main armament no greater than 6.1 in (155 mm) calibre. All three major naval powers sought to circumvent the limitations on heavy cruiser numbers by building light cruisers that were equal in size and effective power to heavy cruisers. These ships made up for their smaller calibre guns by carrying larger numbers of them.

All ships of the class carried BL 6-inch Mk XXIII guns in triple turrets, with the centre gun mounted  behind the two outer guns to prevent interference between the shells in flight and to give the gunners more room to work in. The turret roofs had cutouts at the front to allow extreme elevation, originally intended to give the guns an anti-aircraft capability. In practice the guns could not be trained or manually loaded quickly enough for continuous anti-aircraft fire, so the Royal Navy designed the Auto Barrage Unit (ABU) which allowed the guns to be loaded with time-fuzed shells and then fired when the target aircraft reached a set range. These ships were equipped with the HACS AA fire control system for the secondary armament and the Admiralty Fire Control Table for surface fire control of the main armament.

The secondary armament consisted of four twin Mk XIX 4-inch turrets, and two quad pom-poms. Additional light anti-aircraft weapons were added during the war and the 4-inch mounts were converted to Remote Power Control (RPC). Postwar the Birmingham and Newcastle were partially reconstructed in 1949–51 with enclosed bridges, new lattice masts, improved surface fire control and long range radar and an improved but still unreliable version of the Glasshouse Directors with 275 lock and follow radar, with flyplane control  for the twin 4 inch guns with elevation speed increased to 15–20 degrees per second, to engage faster jet aircraft. Similar electronic alterations were made to Sheffield but it received less structural alteration.  Liverpool was put into reserve in 1952 to preserve it for potential modernisation and Glasgow had a less extensive refit to allow her to be sent quickly if needed in the Suez crisis of 1956. Birmingham, Newcastle and  Sheffield had the pom pom and 20 mm armament replaced by 40mm Bofors mounts.  Belfast was fitted with  MRS 8 HACDT to combine 40 mm and twin 4 inch AA fire and to permit the use of 40 mm proximity fused ammunition as used by the British Army.

Sub-classes

Southampton
Based on the initial design chosen in November 1933, the estimated cost of the new ships was £2.1m each compared to an estimated cost of £1.6m each for a  cruiser.

Initially the class was designated the "M" or "Minotaur" class but was renamed the Town class in November 1934.

Uniquely, the final Southampton class cruiser, HMS Birmingham, was built with a fully flared bow and is easily distinguished by the lack of the prominent knuckle found on her sister-ships. This was due to some elements in the Admiralty being doubtful of the benefits offered by the knuckle design. This modification was introduced during construction in March 1935 but was not continued in the follow-on  Gloucester class.

Gloucester
The subsequent Gloucesters, added a second director control tower for two channels of fire at long range against ship or shore targets and  better protection against plunging fire with a redesigned deck, an intermediate layer of armour above the magazines and machinery area and received thicker armour on the gun turrets. The extra weight is balanced with extra beam, increased from 64.02 ft in the Southampton to 64.10 ft in the three Gloucester ships and more propulsion power with 82,000 shp engines to maintain speed  and add more electrical generation.

Edinburgh

The idea was soon shelved however, due to the difficulties in actually manufacturing an effective quadruple 6 in turret, and so the class reverted to the original main armament design, although improved through a "long trunk" Mk XXIII turret design, which reduced the crew requirements and increased the speed of the ammunition hoists. Four extra 4 in (102 mm) "High Angle Low Angle" guns and eight extra 2-pounder (40 mm) guns and further armour protection were added instead.

Additional ships using the design of Belfast were considered by the Admiralty in 1940 but were eventually rejected.

Later improvements
This was not a problem in the Edinburghs, because they were longer and had more room. They still had substantial modifications to their weaponry, including addition of 40 mm Bofors guns. The addition of radar equipment during the Second World War aided the ships' combat effectiveness.

Service
The first Town-class ship was launched in 1936 and commissioned in 1937, just two years before the outbreak of war. The surviving ships continued in active service to the end of the 1950s, some seeing action during the Korean War. The last Town-class ship to be scrapped was Sheffield in 1967. One ship of the Town class —  — remains, moored on the River Thames in London as a museum-ship of the Imperial War Museum, a role she has performed since 1971.

Ships

See also
 Crown Colony-class cruiser

Notes

References

External links

Cruiser classes
Ship classes of the Royal Navy